is a railway station in Shimizu-ku, Shizuoka City, Shizuoka Prefecture, Japan, operated by Central Japan Railway Company (JR Tōkai).

Lines
Kambara Station is served by the Tōkaidō Main Line, and is located 154.9 kilometers from the starting point of the line at Tokyo Station.

Station layout
The station has a single side platform serving Track 1 and an island platform serving Track 2 and Track 3, connected to the station building by an overpass. Track 2 is used for through transit of express trains, as is Track 4 (without platform) to the outside of Track 3. The station building has automated ticket machines, TOICA automated turnstiles and a staffed ticket office.

Platforms

Adjacent stations

|-
!colspan=5|Central Japan Railway Company

Station history
When the section of the Tōkaidō Main Line connecting Shizuoka with Kōzu was completed in 1889, the initial plan was to construct stations in accord with the traditional 53 stages of the Tokaido road. However, in between Yoshiwara-juku and Kanbara-juku there was a traditionally unnumbered intermediary post station where a branch road led to the pilgrimage location of Mount Minobu.  It was decided to build a railroad station at this location, and to bypass nearby Kambara Town instead. This led to a predictable uproar from Kambara, so Kambara Station was built a year later, but at an inconvenient distance outside of town, so as to keep the spacing between stations fairly even. A station in the middle of Kambara Town was not actually built until Shin-Kambara Station in 1968. Regularly scheduled freight services were discontinued in 1972, and all freight services by 1985.

Station numbering was introduced to the section of the Tōkaidō Line operated JR Central in March 2018; Kambara Station was assigned station number CA11.

Passenger statistics
In fiscal 2017, the station was used by an average of 725 passengers daily (boarding passengers only).

Surrounding area
former Kambara Town Hall

See also
 List of Railway Stations in Japan

References

Yoshikawa, Fumio. Tokaido-sen 130-nen no ayumi. Grand-Prix Publishing (2002) .

External links

Railway stations in Japan opened in 1890
Tōkaidō Main Line
Stations of Central Japan Railway Company
Railway stations in Shizuoka (city)